Arthur Payne (born June 5, 1946) is an American Republican politician. He is a member of the Alabama House of Representatives from the 44th District, being first elected in 1978.

References

1946 births
Living people
Politicians from Birmingham, Alabama
Republican Party members of the Alabama House of Representatives